Henry Cary may refer to:

Henry Cary, 1st Viscount Falkland (1575–1633), coloniser and military officer
Henry Cary, 4th Viscount Falkland (1634–1663), English politician who sat in the House of Commons, 1659–1663
Henry Cary, 8th Viscount Falkland (1766–1796), peer and British Army officer
Henry Francis Cary (1772–1844), English author and translator
Henry Cary (judge) (1804–1870), English-born judge, classical scholar and Anglican clergyman active in Australia
Henry Cary Jr. (c. 1650–1750), Virginia builder
Henry Cary (Archdeacon of Killala)

See also 
Henry Carey (disambiguation)
Henry Carey, 2nd Earl of Monmouth (1596–1661)